The 2006 South Asian Games (also known as the 10th South Asian Games) were held in Colombo, Sri Lanka from 18 August to 28 August 2006, in the Sugathadasa Stadium with more than 2000 sportspersons competing in the record 20 disciplines of Sports.

The 10th edition of SAF Games also marked the debut for Afghanistan. Another highlight of 2006 SAF Games was unprecedented high levels of security for officials & players amid violent clashes between the Sri Lankan Government's troops and LTTE. Earlier in 2005, the Games, originally scheduled to be held in 2005, had been postponed following the Indonesian tsunami wave devastated the northern and eastern region.

Mascots
Pora-Pol (an ancient sport of coconut fighting) and Wali kukula (a jungle fowl) were chosen as the official logo and mascot for the 2006 SAF Games, respectively. However they drew some criticism for the lack of creativity particularly in the case of mascot.

Sports
The 2006 South Asian Games encompassed a record 20 disciplines with hockey being reintroduced after several years.

Participating nations
athletes from eight countries competed at 2006 South Asian Games.
 (86)
 (192)
 (54)
 (293)
 (59)
 (216)
 (288)
 (366)

Medal table
Note : This Section Needs to be Updated after Doping Tests

Schedule

Highlights
Nagalingm Edirith Weeresinghe and Sriyani Kulawansa (both former Sri Lankan athletes) lit the Games torch at the opening ceremony.
India made a clean sweep at Archery, Badminton, Rowing, Wushu.
The Women's Kabaddi event was introduced.
Maldives failed to claim any medal for the second consecutive time.
Sri Lanka Swimmer Mayumi Raheem wins 10 medals (3 Gold, 4 silver, 3 bronze) a record for any athlete at a single games.

Doping at the 2006 South Asian Games
The 10th SAF games could not be freed from infamous trend of steroid-using by athletes to boost their performance, as a group of athletes were reportedly tested positive for the use of banned performance-enhancing substance. Nine positive cases reported after more than 200 urine samples taken during the eight-nation Games were tested at an IOC ratified laboratory in Malaysia. Prominent athletes tested positive included Nepal's double gold-medalist athlete Rajendra Bahadur Bhandari, Pakistani boxers Nauman Karim (Fly Weight 51Kgs), Mehrullah Lasi (Feather Weight 57Kgs), Faisal Karim (Light Welter 64Kgs) and Sri Lanka's athlete Jani Chathurangani Silva. It rumoured on Media Reports that an Indian athlete have failed a dope test. Later Hemasiri Fernando, SriLankan Olympic Committee President said "No Indian Athlete has tested Positive".

References

External links
Info. About 2006 SAF Games
Pictures of opening ceremony
Pictures from 2006 SAIF GAMES

 
South Asian Games
South Asian Games
South Asian Games
South Asian Games
South Asian Games, 2006
South Asian Games, 2006
Multi-sport events in Sri Lanka
South Asian Games